The British 11th Destroyer Flotilla, or Eleventh Destroyer Flotilla, was a naval formation of the Royal Navy from August 1915 to September 1945.

History

World War One
The 11th Destroyer Flotilla was formed in August 1915 and was assigned to the Grand Fleet. It took part in the Battle of Jutland, and then remained with Grand Fleet until November 1918. Initially the formation consisted of sixteen M class destroyers, some of which were replaced by R class destroyers. For most of 1918 the flotilla was mainly using V and W-class destroyers. The flotilla was disbanded in March 1919, but was briefly reformed during the Interwar period.

Interwar period
The flotilla was briefly reformed from 1 July 1935 to 30 August 1935 under the command of Captain Ernest R. Archer (later Vice-Admiral).

Second World War
The flotilla was reformed in 1939 and was attached to the Plymouth Command until 1940 when its ships were dispersed among various escort groups. It was re-established again in August 1942 as part of the Mediterranean Fleet until January 1943. It was reassigned to the Indian Ocean area as part of the Battle Fleet of the Eastern Fleet until September 1945.

Administration

Captains (D) afloat 11th Destroyer Flotilla
Incomplete list of post holders included:

Composition
Included: 
, Plymouth Command September 1939
11th Destroyer Flotilla
  (leader)
Division 21
 
 
 
 
 HMS Winchlsea
Division 22

References

Sources
 Harley, Simon; Lovell, Tony. (2018) "Eleventh Destroyer Flotilla (Royal Navy) – The Dreadnought Project". www.dreadnoughtproject.org. Harley and Lovell, 29 May 2018. Retrieved 9 July 2018.
 Kindell, Don. (2012) "ROYAL NAVY SHIPS, SEPTEMBER 1939". naval-history.net. Gordon Smith.
 Watson, Dr Graham. (2015) Royal Navy Organisation and Ship Deployments 1900–1914". www.naval-history.net. G. Smith. 
 Watson, Dr Graham. (2015) "Royal Navy Organisation and Ship Deployment, Inter-War Years 1919–1938". www.naval-history.net. Gordon Smith.
 Watson, Dr Graham. (2015) "Royal Navy Organisation in World War 2, 1939–1945". www.naval-history.net. Gordon Smith.
 Willmott, H. P. (2009). The Last Century of Sea Power, Volume 1: From Port Arthur to Chanak, 1894–1922. Bloomington, IN, USA: Indiana University Press. .

Destroyer flotillas of the Royal Navy
Military units and formations established in 1915
Military units and formations disestablished in 1919
Military units and formations established in 1935
Military units and formations disestablished in 1935
Military units and formations established in 1939
Military units and formations disestablished in 1945